Jerri Lin Nielsen ( Cahill; March 1, 1952 – June 23, 2009) was an American physician with extensive emergency room experience, who self-treated her breast cancer while stationed at Amundsen–Scott South Pole Station in Antarctica until she could be evacuated safely.

In 1998, during the southern winter, at a time when the station is physically cut off from the rest of the world, she developed breast cancer. Nielsen teleconferenced with medical personnel in the United States and had to operate on herself in order to extract tissue samples for analysis. A military plane was later dispatched to the pole to airdrop equipment and medications. Her condition remained life-threatening, and the first plane to land at the station in the spring was sent several weeks earlier than planned, despite adverse weather conditions, to take her to the U.S. as soon as possible. Her ordeal attracted a great amount of attention from the media, and Nielsen later wrote an autobiographical book recounting her story.
 
The cancer went into remission, but recurred seven years later, eventually causing her death in 2009 from brain metastatic disease, eleven years after initial diagnosis.

Early life and education
Born as Jerri Lin Cahill in Salem, Ohio on March 1, 1952, a suburb of Youngstown, Ohio, Nielsen was the oldest child and only daughter of Philip and Lorine Cahill, who raised their family in a rural area just outside Salem. She graduated pre-med from Ohio University in Athens before entering the Medical College of Ohio in Toledo and graduating with a medical degree.

While at Ohio University she also met Jay Nielsen, who she subsequently married. They had three children before divorcing acrimoniously in 1998. She continued to work as a physician in various medical fields, mostly as an ER surgeon.

Antarctic stay

In 1998, Nielsen was hired for a one-year contract to serve as the medical doctor at the Amundsen-Scott South Pole Station on Antarctica. This isolated region experiences almost total darkness for the six months of winter, during which the temperature remains around −60 °C (−76 °F). During this period, the station is completely cut off from the world, as no planes fly there between mid-February and late October. The "winterover" crew is thus stranded and entirely autonomous.

In the course of her work at the research station, Nielsen discovered a lump in her breast. After consulting US physicians via e-mail and video conference, she performed a biopsy upon herself. The results were, however, inconclusive, because the material used on site was too outdated to allow for a precise diagnosis.

The National Science Foundation decided to send a military plane to airdrop supplies and medication for her treatment. Such airdrops had been a yearly event several years earlier, when the station was run by the US Navy, but had later been stopped. The plane did not attempt a landing because its skis would risk sticking to the ice and its fuel and hydraulic lines would rapidly freeze, dooming the craft. South Pole workers lit fires in barrels in the Antarctic night to mark out a drop zone. An Air Force C-141 cargo plane, staged out of Christchurch, overflew the Pole in the darkness of mid-July and sent six bundles of supplies and medical equipment parachuting toward the station.

Using the parachuted supplies, Nielsen began her treatment, following the advice of her doctors over the satellite link. She first began a hormone treatment. She trained her South Pole colleagues to form a small team that could assist her in the procedures. A new biopsy performed with the airdropped equipment allowed better scans to be sent to the US, where it was confirmed that the cells were indeed cancerous. With the help of her makeshift medical team, Nielsen then began self-administering chemotherapy.

In October, a LC-130 Hercules was sent several weeks ahead of schedule, despite the risks inherent to flying in such cold weather, to bring Nielsen back home as soon as possible; the plane took off from the base on October 15. Another crew member, who had suffered a hip injury during the winter, was also evacuated.

After returning to the United States
Once back in the United States, after multiple surgeries, complications and a mastectomy, Nielsen went into remission. She became a motivational speaker and a scholarship was created in her honor; she also remarried, to Tom Fitzgerald. In 2001, Nielsen was named Irish American of the Year by Irish America magazine.

Metastasis
After being in remission, the cancer returned in 2005 and metastasized to Nielsen's brain, liver and bones, but she continued to give speeches and traveled extensively including to Hong Kong, Vietnam, Australia, Ireland, Alaska, Poland, and she returned to Antarctica several times. In October 2008, Dr. Nielsen announced that her cancer had returned in the form of a brain tumor. She was active and giving talks until March 2009, three months before her death.

She died at her home in Southwick, Massachusetts on June 23, 2009, at age 57. She was survived by her second husband, Tom Fitzgerald; her parents, Lorine and Phil Cahill; her brothers, Scott Cahill and Eric Cahill; and her children from her previous marriage: Julia, Ben and Alex.

Media depictions
With ghostwriter Maryanne Vollers, Nielsen's story was told in the autobiographical Ice Bound: A Doctor's Incredible Story of Survival at the South Pole, which became a New York Times bestseller. The book was later adapted into Ice Bound: A Woman's Survival at the South Pole, a 2003 CBS-TV movie starring Susan Sarandon, and in 2008 became the inspiration for an episode of Fox Network show House, "Frozen", in which the team must somehow, via teleconference, diagnose and treat a stricken psychiatrist at the South Pole. The story of her rescue was featured on The Weather Channel's When Weather Changed History in the "Rescue from the South Pole" in January 2008.

See also
Nielsen's case shares some similarities with that of Dr. Leonid Rogozov, who had to remove his own appendix while spending the winter at Novolazarevskaya research station in 1961. Since this incident, that station has always been staffed with two doctors.

References

Sources

External links
 AP Obituary in the Boston Herald
 RIP Dr Jerri Nielsen
 Jerri Nielsen Daily Telegraph obituary
 

1952 births
2009 deaths
American emergency physicians
Deaths from cancer in Massachusetts
Deaths from breast cancer
People from Southwick, Massachusetts
People from Youngstown, Ohio
Female polar explorers
People from Salem, Ohio
Women Antarctic scientists
American Antarctic scientists
Health in Antarctica
American people of Irish descent
20th-century American women physicians
20th-century American physicians
20th-century American people
21st-century American women